Bahçeli is a village in the Keban District of Elazığ Province in Turkey. The village is populated by Kurds of the Milan tribe and had a population of 34 in 2021.

References

Villages in Keban District
Kurdish settlements in Elazığ Province